Manoj Ingale (born 26 June 1994) is an Indian cricketer. He made his Twenty20 debut for Maharashtra in the 2018–19 Syed Mushtaq Ali Trophy on 21 February 2019. He made his first-class debut on 3 January 2020, for Maharashtra in the 2019–20 Ranji Trophy. He made his List A debut on 8 December 2021, for Maharashtra in the 2021–22 Vijay Hazare Trophy.

References

External links
 

1994 births
Living people
Indian cricketers
Maharashtra cricketers
Place of birth missing (living people)